Georg Zimmermann (born 11 October 1997) is a German racing cyclist, who currently rides for UCI WorldTeam .

Career
In August 2019, Zimmermann joined UCI WorldTeam  as a stagiaire for the second half of the season, before joining the team permanently in 2020. In October 2020, he was named in the startlist for the 2020 Vuelta a España.

Ahead of the 2021 season, Zimmermann moved to  team, who brought the license of his previous team.

Major results

2015
 2nd Road race, National Junior Road Championships
 2nd Overall GP Général Patton
1st  Points classification
 6th Overall Oberösterreich Juniorenrundfahrt
1st Stage 1
 10th Overall Giro della Lunigiana
2018
 1st Stage 3 Giro della Friuli Venezia Giulia
 3rd Raiffeisen Grand Prix
 7th Giro del Belvedere
2019
 1st  Mountains classification, Tour of Austria
 1st Trofeo Piva
 1st Coppa della Pace
 5th Overall Tour de l'Avenir
 5th Road race, National Road Championships
 8th Overall Tour of Antalya
2020
 1st  Mountains classification, Étoile de Bessèges
 4th Road race, National Road Championships
2021
 3rd Road race, National Road Championships
 5th Overall Deutschland Tour
1st  Young rider classification
 7th Overall Tour de l'Ain
1st Stage 2
 7th Trofeo Serra de Tramuntana
 8th Trofeo Andratx – Mirador d’Es Colomer
2022
 3rd Giro dell'Appennino
 4th Overall Deutschland Tour
1st  Young rider classification
 5th Grand Prix of Aargau Canton
 7th Grand Prix La Marseillaise
2023
 7th La Drôme Classic
 8th Clásica Jaén Paraíso Interior
 10th Trofeo Laigueglia

Grand Tour general classification results timeline

References

External links
 

1997 births
Living people
German male cyclists
Sportspeople from Augsburg
Cyclists from Bavaria